Dario Canas (29 February 1884 – 3 June 1966) was a Portuguese sports shooter. He competed at the 1920 Summer Olympics and the 1924 Summer Olympics.

References

External links
 

1884 births
1966 deaths
Portuguese male sport shooters
Olympic shooters of Portugal
Shooters at the 1920 Summer Olympics
Shooters at the 1924 Summer Olympics
People from Lisboa Region